The Hampton Negro Conference was a series of conferences held between 1897 and 1912 hosted by the Hampton Institute (now Hampton University) in Hampton, Virginia.  It brought together Black leaders from across the Southern United States, as well as some white participants, to promote, analyze, and advertise the progress of Black Americans.  According to a description in the Institute's catalog, through the conferences "a general summary of the material and intellectual progress of the Negro race [was] obtained."

The first Conference was held from July 21 to July 22, 1897.  The conferences ranged over a variety of topics including health, agriculture, women's issues, crime, and education.  In preceding years there appear to have been more informal meetings of alumni at the Institute, also referred to as the Hampton Negro Conference, as seen for example in the papers of Booker T. Washington.

The 1907 trustees report of the John F. Slater Fund for the Education of Freedmen, which had directed $10,000 to the Hampton Institute in that year, stated that the conference was attended by four hundred to five hundred teachers, prominent business and professional men, and farmers.

Writing in 1917, John Manuel Gandy characterized the Conference as "the clearing house of ideas of Negro activities" for its time.

Publications

See also 
 Colored Conventions Movement
 Atlanta Conference of Negro Problems

References

19th-century conferences
20th-century conferences
Conferences in the United States
Academic conferences
Cultural conferences
Political conferences
Hampton University
African-American history of Virginia
African-American history between emancipation and the civil rights movement
African-American cultural history
History of African-American civil rights
Cultural heritage of the United States
Defunct organizations based in Virginia
1897 establishments in Virginia
Organizations established in 1897
1912 disestablishments in the United States
Organizations disestablished in 1912